Csilla Andrea Molnár (20 January 1969 – 10 July 1986) was a Hungarian beauty queen. She was crowned Miss Hungary on 5 October 1985, in Budapest, the first Hungarian beauty queen after a 50-year interval. She also entered for the Miss Europa 1986 beauty contest in Malta, where she came in third place.

She committed suicide on 10 July 1986 by overdosing on lidocaine.  In a radio interview, shortly before her death, she complained of being harassed by the public saying: "I don't know whether I can bear this, everybody is harassing me. They ask: Where and from whom did you get those beautiful clothes? Who helped you? Do you or your father have special connections with the jury? And so on".

Her life and death continues to be a source of interest in modern Hungarian news media.

On 20 January 2019, several Hungarian newspapers reviewed her biography on what would have been her 50th birthday.

Bibliography

References

External links
 
 

1969 births
1986 deaths
1986 suicides
Hungarian beauty pageant winners
Hungarian female models
People from Kaposvár
Drug-related suicides in Hungary